Pachychila pubescens, commonly known as pink kunai orchid or as 粉口兰 (fen kou lan), is a plant in the orchid family. It is native to areas from Asia through Southeast Asia to New Guinea and northern Australia. It is a deciduous, terrestrial herb with one or two grass-like leaves and up to ten dull pink, more or less drooping flowers. It grows in wet, grassy places in forests and woodlands.

Description
The petals are a similar length to the sepals but narrower. The middle lobe has a square tip and pimply surface and the side lobes curve upwards. Flowering occurs in November and December in Australia and March to September in Asia.

Taxonomy and naming
Pachystoma pubescens was first described in 1825 by Carl Ludwig Blume, in his Bijdragen tot de Flora van Nederlandsch Indie. The specific epithet (pubescens) is derived from the Latin word pubesco meaning "put on the down of puberty" with the ending -escens meaning "beginning of" or "becoming", hence "pubescent".

Distribution and habitat
The pink kunal orchid often grows with grasses such as kunai grass (Imperata cylindrica) in woodland and forest areas that are seasonally wet. It occurs in China, Bangladesh, Bhutan, Cambodia, India, Indonesia, Laos, Malaysia, Myanmar, New Guinea, the Philippines, Vietnam and in Australia where it is found in northern parts of the Northern Territory and in Tropical North Queensland.

References

Plants described in 1825
pubescens
Orchids of Australia
Orchids of China
Orchids of Bangladesh
Orchids of Cambodia
Orchids of Indonesia
Orchids of Malaysia
Orchids of Myanmar
Orchids of India
Orchids of New Guinea
Orchids of the Philippines
Orchids of Vietnam
Orchids of Asia